Stanislav Vlček (born 26 February 1976) is a Czech former football striker. He is best known for playing for Slavia Prague, Anderlecht and Dynamo Moscow.

Career

Vlcek started his career with Bohemians Praha at the age of 17.

Vlček signed a contract with Anderlecht for 2,5 years on 21 December 2007. His previous club was Slavia Prague, where he returned on 16 April 2009. In 2012, he finished his career as player, and became a scout for Slavia.

Attributes
He was a well travelled player with a lot of experience. Apart from playing as a striker, Vlček could also play on the wing.

International career
Vlček was capped 14 times for the Czech Republic national football team.

References

External links
 
 
 
 SK Slavia Prague profile 
 

1976 births
Living people
Czech footballers
Czech Republic youth international footballers
Czech Republic under-21 international footballers
Czech Republic international footballers
Czech expatriate footballers
Czech First League players
Bohemians 1905 players
SK Sigma Olomouc players
SK Slavia Prague players
SK Dynamo České Budějovice players
FC Dynamo Moscow players
R.S.C. Anderlecht players
Belgian Pro League players
Expatriate footballers in Belgium
UEFA Euro 2008 players
Expatriate footballers in Russia
People from Vlašim
Russian Premier League players
Association football midfielders
Association football forwards
SK Slavia Prague non-playing staff
Association football scouts
Sportspeople from the Central Bohemian Region